Thomas Whitham Sixth Form was a mixed 16 to 18 sixth form centre in Burnley, Lancashire.

History 
The sixth form opened in September 2006, as part of the first wave of a nationwide 10 to 15-year programme of capital investment funded by the Department for Education and Skills called Building Schools for the Future..

For the first two years of its existence, under the temporary name of Burnley Schools' Sixth Form, it occupied the site of the former Barden High School, before moving into new premises in September 2008, on an adjacent site. It is named after Thomas Whitham VC who served during World War I. It was judged "good with outstanding features" in an inspection by Ofsted in 2011.

Due to decreasing number of students, and a worsening financial position, the 6th Form was closed in 2020.

Buildings and structures in Burnley
Educational institutions established in 2006
2006 establishments in England
Educational institutions disestablished in 2020
2020 disestablishments in England